Zatkoff is a surname. Notable people with the surname include:

Jeff Zatkoff (born 1987), American ice hockey player
Lawrence Paul Zatkoff (1939–2015), American judge
Roger Zatkoff (born 1931), American football player and businessman